Oak Hill may refer to:
Oak Hill, Austin, Texas (in Travis County)
Oak Hill, Bastrop County, Texas
Oak Hill, Jasper County, Texas
Oak Hill, Johnson County, Texas
Oak Hill, Rusk County, Texas